Nelsonia is a genus of plants in the family Acanthaceae.  They can be found in tropical: Africa (including Madagascar), Latin America, south-east Asia and Australia.

Species 
The Plant List currently (November 2017) lists the following species:
 Nelsonia canescens (Lam.) Spreng.
 Nelsonia gracilis  Vollesen
 Nelsonia rotundifolia R.Br. (Unresolved)
 Nelsonia smithii  Oerst. 
 Nelsonia vestita Schult. (Unresolved)

Synonyms and obsolete taxa 
The Plant List (9 October 2012) listed the following species names:
 Nelsonia albicans Kunth = Nelsonia canescens (Lam.) Spreng.  (1824)
 Nelsonia brunelloides (Lam.) Kuntze = Nelsonia canescens (Lam.) Spreng.  (1824)
 Nelsonia campestris R.Br. = Nelsonia canescens (Lam.) Spreng.  (1824)
 Nelsonia campestris var. vestita (Roem. & Schult.) C.B. Clarke = Nelsonia canescens (Lam.) Spreng. (1824)
 Nelsonia canescens var. smithii (Oerst.) E.Hossain = Nelsonia smithii  Oerst. (1854)
 Nelsonia canescens var. vestita (Roem. & Schult.) E. Hossain = Nelsonia canescens (Lam.) Spreng. (1824)
 Nelsonia hirsuta (Vahl) Roem. & Schult. = Nelsonia canescens (Lam.) Spreng. (1824)
 Nelsonia lamiifolia (Roxb.) Spreng. = Nelsonia canescens (Lam.) Spreng. (1824)
 Nelsonia origanoides (Vahl) Roem. & Schult. = Nelsonia canescens (Lam.) Spreng. (1824)
 Nelsonia pohlii Nees = Nelsonia canescens  (Lam.) Spreng. (1824)
 Nelsonia rotundifolia R. Br. = Nelsonia canescens (Lam.) Spreng. (1824)
 Nelsonia senegalensis Oerst. = Nelsonia canescens (Lam.) Spreng. (1824)
 Nelsonia tomentosa A. Dietr. = Nelsonia canescens (Lam.) Spreng. (1824)
 Nelsonia villosa Oerst. = Nelsonia canescens (Lam.) Spreng. (1824)

References

Acanthaceae
Acanthaceae genera